Mike Cherry (born December 15, 1973) is a former American football quarterback. He was drafted by the New York Giants in the 6th round of the  1997 NFL Draft. He played college football at Murray State University.

Early years
Cherry attended Arkansas High School in Texarkana, Arkansas, where he was an honor student and excelled in football, basketball and track.

College career
Cherry enrolled at the University of Arkansas, where he was a backup quarterback for the Arkansas Razorbacks football team from 1993 to 1994. He later transferred to the Murray State University, reuniting him with former Arkansas Razorback assistant Houston Nutt, who was the head coach of the Murray State Racers at the time. Cherry was the Racers starting quarterback from 1995 to 1996. He led the Racers to two Ohio Valley Conference Championships. While at Murray State, Cherry threw for 4,490 passing yards, completing 365 of his 640 passing attempts for 36 touchdowns.

Professional career
Cherry was drafted by the New York Giants in 1997, serving as the team's third-string quarterback from 1997 to 2000. During the 1998 season, he saw limited regular season action, throwing one incomplete pass.  In 2001, Cherry was a member of the NFC champion New York Giants.

References

External links
University of Arkansas Statistics
PRO FOOTBALL; Kanell's Demotion Provides Cherry an Opportunity

1973 births
Living people
People from Texarkana, Arkansas
Players of American football from Arkansas
American football quarterbacks
Arkansas Razorbacks football players
Murray State Racers football players
New York Giants players